The International Society for Laboratory Hematology (ISLH) is a non-profit organisation founded in 1992. Its purpose is to provide a forum for dissemination of new ideas and information related to the field of laboratory hematology.

History
In 1984 Dr. Berend Houwen began to organize meetings which brought together scientists, manufacturers, clinicians, and regulatory representatives to exchange ideas on technical innovations in laboratory hematology. The first meeting was held in Banff, Alberta, Canada. The success of these meetings led to the formation of ISLH in 1992.

At the time of incorporation, members of the society agreed to start a new journal for the publication of research and review articles in the broadening arena of laboratory hematology. In 2003 this journal,  Laboratory Hematology, began to be officially indexed by the National Center for Biotechnology Information. The current journal, The International Journal of Laboratory Hematology, is the official journal of the ISLH. It provides an international forum for new developments in the research and practice of laboratory hematology and includes invited reviews, original articles, research results and correspondence.

ISLH has been instrumental in standards and guidelines development in laboratory hematology. In 2001 the organization published the first flow-based reference method for platelet counting. In 2005 it published a document titled The International Consensus Group for Hematology Review: Suggested Criteria for Action Following Automated CBC and White blood cell Differential Analysis. This publication gathered 20 leading hematology laboratorians from around the globe to share their views on slide review.  It has been used extensively by laboratory hematologists since its publication. ISLH also maintains affiliation with the International Committee for Standardization in Hematology (ICSH), and sponsors review studies in its field.

ISLH has also expanded its focus to include a number of sub-disciplines related to laboratory hematology, including Cellular Analysis, Flow Cytometry, Hemostasis and Thrombosis, Molecular Diagnostics, Hematology Informatics, Hemoglobinopathies, Hemolytic Anemias, Point of Care Testing and Standards and guidelines. ISLH addresses these with symposia, research and journal reviews. As of 2015, the ISLH has about 900 members from more than 50 countries. It organizes annual international scientific meetings held in the US, Europe or Asia.

ISLH Annual Symposium
Held each spring, the annual meeting brings together laboratory hematologists from around the world to discuss critical issues in laboratory hematology. The symposium features a combination of invited speakers, oral and poster presentations, and commercial exhibits/workshops.  Approximately 700-1200 laboratory hematologists attend the meeting each year.

References

External links
 International Society for Laboratory Hematology website 
 International Journal of Laboratory Hematology. journal

Hematology organizations
Medical and health organizations based in Illinois